The County of Borung is one of the 37 counties of Victoria which are part of the cadastral divisions of Australia, used for land titles. The northern boundary of the county is at 36°S. At the north its western boundary is 142°E, its eastern boundary is 143°E. Larger towns include Dimboola, Warracknabeal, Horsham and Stawell. The county was proclaimed in 1871 together with the other counties of the Wimmera Land District. The county was proclaimed in 1871.

Parishes 
Parishes within the county:
Ararat (part in the County of Ripon)
Areegra
Ashens
Bangerang
Batchica  
Batyik 
Bellaura 
Bellellen 
Beyal
Boreang East (part in the County of Dundas)
Boreang West (part in the County of Dundas)
Boroka
Bulgana (part in the County of Ripon)
Bungalally
Burrong North 
Burrong South
Burrum Burrum (part in the County of Kara Kara)
Callawadda (part in the County of Kara Kara)
Cannum 
Carron
Concongella   
Concongella South (part in the County of Ripon)
Corack
Dimboola (part in the County of Lowan)
Dollin (part in the County of Lowan)
Dooen
Drung Drung
Dunmunkle
Dunneworthy (part in the County of Ripon)
Gampola
Glenorchy
Glynwylln (part in the County of Kara Kara)
Golton Golton
Hindmarsh
Horsham
Illawarra
Jallukar
Jeparit
Joop  
Jung Jung 
Kalkee
Kalymna (part in the County of Ripon)
Katyil
Kellalac 
Kewell East  
Kewell West  
Kirkella 
Knaawing 
Laen 
Lah-arum
Lallat 
Ledcourt
Lexington (part in the County of Ripon)
Longerenong  
Marma 
Mockinya (part in the County of Lowan)
Mokepilly
Mount Cole (parts in the County of Kara Kara and County of Ripon)
Moyston  
Moyston West 
Narraport
Nullan
Quantong
Riachella
Rich Avon East (part in the County of Kara Kara)
Rich Avon West
Rupanyup
Stawell
Tarranyurk
Vectis East
Wallup
Warmur
Warracknabeal
Warrak (part in the County of Kara Kara)
Warranook
Warra Warra
Wartook 
Warung 
Watchem
Watta Wella
Werrigar 
Wilkur 
Willam 
Willenabrina
Wirchilleba (part in the County of Kara Kara)
Witchipool
Wonwondah
Yellangip

References

Research aids, Victoria 1910
Map of the counties of Lowan, Borung and Kara Kara showing colony and parish boundaries, main roads, telegraph lines and railways.  1886. National Library of Australia

Counties of Victoria (Australia)